Christkindlmarket is a Christmas market held annually at Daley Plaza in Chicago, Illinois, United States.  The festival attracts more than 1 million visitors each year.

History 

The German American Chamber of Commerce of the Midwest first held Chicago's Christkindlmarket on Pioneer Court in 1996. Christkindlmarket was inspired by the Christkindlesmarkt in Nuremberg, Germany.  In 1997, Mayor Daley requested that the festival be moved to Daley Plaza.  That year the market attracted more than 750,000 visitors.  By 1999, the Christkindlmarket had become part of the Magnificent Mile Lights Festival.  In recent years, Chicago's Christkindlmarket has become the largest Christmas market in the United States, hosting well over 1 million visitors annually. In 2016, Christkindlmarket expanded to the Chicago suburb of Naperville. Four years later, a virtual market took place.

Vendors and attractions 

The market is situated by a large Christmas tree at Daley Plaza and also houses a small nativity scene. The site features entertainment from Christmas choirs, dance groups, and brass bands.  It also houses a Santa house. At the site beer, wine, baked goods, meats, toys, holiday ornaments, and other Christmas decorations are sold by vendors from Germany, Ukraine, Austria, and the Chicago metropolitan area.

See also 
List of Christmas markets
Christmas market

References

Further reading 
 Zug, J.D. (1991). German-American Life: Recipes and Traditions. Iowa City: Penfield Press.

Notes

External links
Christkindlmarket
German American Chamber of Commerce of the Midwest

Christmas markets
Festivals in Chicago
Tourist attractions in Chicago
Articles containing video clips